Kim Lim-hwan (born 6 May 1992) is a South Korean judoka.

He won a medal at the 2019 World Judo Championships. In 2021, he won one of the bronze medals in his event at the 2021 Asian-Pacific Judo Championships held in Bishkek, Kyrgyzstan.

References

External links
 
 

1992 births
Living people
South Korean male judoka
21st-century South Korean people